Orthonama evansi is a species of geometrid moth in the family Geometridae. It is found in North America.

The MONA or Hodges number for Orthonama evansi is 7415.

References

Further reading

External links

 

Xanthorhoini
Articles created by Qbugbot
Moths described in 1920